Folkvord may refer to the following people with the surname:

 Erling Folkvord (1949–),  Norwegian politician
 Gard Folkvord (1969–), Norwegian politician
 Gerald Kador Folkvord, German author
 Magnhild Folkvord (1945–}, Norwegian journalist and biographer
 Svein Folkvord (1967–), Norwegian Jazz musician